Rashawn Scott may refer to:

 Rashawn Scott (American football) (born 1992), American football wide receiver
 Rashawn Scott (footballer) (born 2004), English association football midfielder